Fay Gunderson Peck (1931 – 2016) was an American Expressionist artist, known for her oil painting and printmaking.

Biography 
Fay Gunderson was born in Chicago, Illinois on August 7, 1931, to parents Alice Gunderson and Gunnar E. Gunderson. She was of Norwegian descent. She grew up in rural River Forest, Illinois. In 1954, she married David Bell Peck III on her family farm in Lemont.

She attended University of Miami, and studied in the summers at University of Wisconsin and the University of Oslo. She participated in art workshops and studied at Anderson Ranch Arts Center and Evanston Art Center, where she studied with artist Paul Wieghardt.

Her work is in many collections including Rice University; First National Bank of Chicago; the New York Stock Exchange; Goldman Sachs; and various United States embassies.

Publications

References 

1931 births
2016 deaths
American women artists
University of Miami alumni
American Expressionist painters
People from River Forest, Illinois
People from Bozeman, Montana
Artists from Chicago
American people of Norwegian descent
21st-century American women